The 2002 United States Senate election in Massachusetts took place on November 5, 2002. Incumbent Democratic U.S. Senator John Kerry won re-election to a fourth term against Libertarian Michael Cloud, with no Republican filing to run. 

The lack of a Republican Party candidate caused Cloud to receive the largest percentage of votes for a U.S. Senate candidate in the Libertarian Party's history at that time, though this record has since been eclipsed by Joe Miller in Alaska in 2016 and Ricky Dale Harrington Jr. in Arkansas in 2020. Cloud also won the largest number of raw votes for a Libertarian candidate at the time, since eclipsed by Harrington.

Kerry's support for the invasion of Iraq also prompted a late write-in challenge by anti-war candidate Randall Forsberg.

Democratic primary

General election

Candidates
  Michael Cloud (Libertarian)
 Randall Forsberg, anti-war activist (Independent, write-in)
 John Kerry, incumbent U.S. Senator since 1985 (Democratic)

Predictions

Results

See also 
 2002 United States Senate elections

References

External links 
  2002 Statewide Election results

United States Senate
Massachusetts
John Kerry
2002